Currituck Co. (short for Currituck County) is an indie folk project started in 2000 by Kevin Barker, who is also the former lead guitarist for Aden. Originally formed in Washington, D.C., Barker moved to New York City the following year, taking the project with him.

Studio album discography
Long Playing Record Album (Death Rattle Of The West, 2000)
Unpacking My Library (TeenBeat, 2002)
Ghost Man on First (Lexicon Devil/Track & Field, 2003/2004)
Sleepwalks in the Garden of the Deadroom (Track & Field, 2005)
Ghost Man on Second (Troubleman Unlimited, 2005)

References

External links

American indie folk groups
Musical groups established in 2000
Musical groups from New York City
Musical groups from Washington, D.C.
2000 establishments in Washington, D.C.
TeenBeat Records artists